Sphaenorhynchus cammaeus is a frog in the family Hylidae endemic to Brazil.  Scientists know it exclusively from the type locality: Reserva Biológica de Pedra Talhada, 850 meters above sea level.

The scientists who wrote original description cited an average snout-vent length among adult male frogs of 24.8–29.3 mm. Their only adult female specimen measured 26.6 mm.

References

Frogs of South America
Amphibians described in 2017
cammaeus